Gladys Grace Mae Strum (February 4, 1906 – August 15, 2005) was a Canadian politician.

Early life 
Born in Gladstone, Manitoba, she moved to Saskatchewan when she was 16 to teach.

Career 
She ran unsuccessfully for a seat in the Legislative Assembly of Saskatchewan in 1938 and again in 1944. In 1944, she became president of the Saskatchewan Co-operative Commonwealth Federation (CCF), the first woman to occupy the position for a provincial party in Canada. She was elected to the House of Commons of Canada in 1945 for the riding of Qu'Appelle. She was only the fifth woman ever elected to the House of Commons and the only woman in the 20th Canadian parliament. She was defeated in 1949 and 1953.

In 1960, she was elected Saskatoon's first woman in the Saskatchewan legislature.

Gladys was a fierce proponent for Canada taking in more European refugees affected by World War II, especially children. She would often state these views during meetings in the House of Commons, and publicly denounced the significantly lower number of refugees Canada housed in comparison to Great Britain, who faced more grievances than Canada did during the War.

Personal life 
Gladys married school board chairman Warner Strum in 1929 at Vanguard, Saskatchewan. She was a mother to 11 children. She had only one biological child, Carol Elaine, who by 1947 was an undergraduate in architecture at the Manitoba University. The other ten children, two from Spain and eight from Czechoslovakia, were all refugees adopted through the USC Canada (now SeedChange) between the years 1945 and 1947.

Electoral record

References

External links
 
 Library and Archives Canada biography

1906 births
2005 deaths
Women members of the House of Commons of Canada
Women MLAs in Saskatchewan
Canadian people of Swedish descent
Co-operative Commonwealth Federation MPs
20th-century Canadian politicians
Members of the House of Commons of Canada from Saskatchewan
Saskatchewan Co-operative Commonwealth Federation MLAs
20th-century Canadian women politicians